Manfred Cassirer (12 July 1920 – 18 December 2003) was a British Egyptologist and parapsychologist.

Cassirer was born in Berlin. Being half-Jewish he moved to Paris to stay with a relative when he was a child. He was psychologically disturbed during his youth. He later moved to Oxford where he studied theology. He obtained a degree in Egyptology and studied at St Peter's College, Oxford.

He was a member of the Society for Psychical Research which he joined in 1975.

Publications
Parapsychology and the UFO (1988)
The Persecution of Mr Tony Elms: The Bromley Poltergeist (1993)
Dimensions of Enchantment: The Mystery of UFO Abductions (1994)
Close Encounters and Aliens (1994)
Medium on Trial: The Story of Helen Duncan (1997)
The Hidden Powers of Nature (2001)
Miracles of the Bible (2003)

References

1920 births
2003 deaths
British Egyptologists
Parapsychologists
Ufologists
Writers from Berlin
Jewish emigrants from Nazi Germany to the United Kingdom
Alumni of St Peter's College, Oxford
German expatriates in France